Pomasqui Valley is a valley on the northern outskirts of Quito, Ecuador. Hot and semi-arid, it is formed by a river tributary. The valley contains the Cerro de Catequilla, which contains the pre-Columbian astronomical observatory, Catequilla. The Monjas River flows nearby and the valley is an important centre for viniculture in Ecuador, with vineyards. The economy features vegetable and fruit production. To the northwest is the Pululahua Geobotanical Reserve.

History
The valley played an important role in military conflict as the Spanish army under Benalcazar invaded in 1534. Atahualpa leaders such as Rumiñahui and Quizquiz led organized attacks against the invading Spanish, and some 4000 locals were slaughtered by them here for giving in to the invaders.

References

Further reading
 Almeida, R. E. (1995). Apuntes etnohistóricos del Valle de Pomasqui ("Ethnohistorical notes Pomasqui Valley"). Quito: Ediciones Abya-Yala. 

Valleys of Ecuador
Quito
Quito Canton
Geography of Pichincha Province